The booting process of Microsoft Windows varies between different releases.

DOS-based Windows

Windows 1.x/2.x
In Windows versions 1.01 to Windows 2.11, the system was loaded when WIN.COM was executed. It then loaded WIN100.BIN or WIN200.BIN and WIN100.OVL or WIN200.OVL, along with the configuration settings file WIN.INI. The default shell is the MS-DOS Executive.

The modules GDI.EXE, KERNEL.EXE and USER.EXE, fonts, and the various device drivers (such as COMM.DRV, MOUSE.DRV, KEYBOARD.DRV) are incorporated in WIN100.BIN/WIN200.BIN and WIN100.OVL/WIN200.OVL.

Windows 3.x/9x

In Windows 3.x and 95/98/ME, the boot loader phase is handled by MS-DOS. During the boot phase, CONFIG.SYS and AUTOEXEC.BAT are executed, along with the configuration settings files WIN.INI and SYSTEM.INI. Virtual device drivers are also loaded in the startup process: they are most commonly loaded from the registry (HKLM\System\CurrentControlSet\Services\VxD) or from the SYSTEM.INI file.

When all system configuration files and device drivers have been loaded, the 16-bit modules, KRNL386.EXE, GDI.EXE, and USER.EXE, are loaded, then the 32-bit DLLs (KERNEL32.DLL, GDI32.DLL, and USER32.DLL) are loaded. The 32-bit VxD message server (MSGSRV32) starts MPREXE.EXE, which is responsible for loading the network logon client (such as Client for Microsoft Networks, Microsoft Family Logon or Windows Logon).

When a user is logging on to Windows, the startup sound is played, the shell (usually EXPLORER.EXE) is loaded from the [boot] section of the SYSTEM.INI file, and startup items are loaded.

In all versions of Windows 9x except ME, it is also possible to load Windows by booting to a DOS prompt and typing "win". There are some command line switches that can be used with the WIN command: with the /D switch, Windows boots to safe mode, and with the /D:n switch, Windows boots to safe mode with networking. The latter switch only works properly with Windows 95. In Windows 3.1, additional options are available, such as /3, which starts Windows in 386 enhanced mode, and /S, which starts Windows in standard mode

A startup sound was first added in Windows 3.0 after installing the Multimedia Extensions (MME), but not enabled by default until Windows 3.1.

Windows NT before Vista

In Windows NT, the boot loader is called NTLDR. It is responsible for accessing the file system on the boot drive, for starting ntoskrnl.exe and for loading boot-time device drivers into memory. Once all the Boot and System drivers have been loaded, the kernel (system thread) starts the Session Manager Subsystem (smss.exe), which in turn starts winlogon, which loads the graphical identification and authentication library.

After a user has successfully logged into the machine, winlogon does the following:

 User and Computer Group Policy settings are applied.
 Startup programs are run from the following locations:
HKLM\SOFTWARE\Microsoft\Windows\CurrentVersion\Runonce
HKLM\SOFTWARE\Microsoft\Windows\CurrentVersion\policies\Explorer\Run
HKLM\SOFTWARE\Microsoft\Windows\CurrentVersion\Run
HKCU\Software\Microsoft\Windows NT\CurrentVersion\Windows\Run
HKCU\Software\Microsoft\Windows\CurrentVersion\Run
HKCU\Software\Microsoft\Windows\CurrentVersion\RunOnce
All Users ProfilePath\Start Menu\Programs\Startup\ (this path is localized on non-English versions of Windows)
Current User ProfilePath\Start Menu\Programs\Startup\ (this path is localized on non-English versions of Windows)

In Windows 95/98/ME, it was also possible to run a program before the user logs on by using RunServicesOnce or RunServices keys. In Windows NT, this has been replaced by the services.exe program, which is able to load a set of system services before a user logs on.

Additionally, in English-language versions of Windows, the startup folder was called "StartUp" instead of "Startup" in Win9x.

Due to the minimally restricted environment of these operating systems, any program can add itself to the Startup registry key or system folder. This method is frequently used by malware.

Windows NT since Vista

The sequence of booting Windows Vista and later versions is different from any previous version of Windows that uses the NT kernel. The operating system boot loader in Vista is called winload.exe, and is invoked by Windows Boot Manager. Additionally, the GINA that has been in use with all versions of Windows NT since 3.1 has been entirely replaced by "Credential Providers".

See also
Booting process of Linux

References

Windows architecture
Booting